SproutWorld is a Danish company that develops sustainable and plantable writing tools.
The company was established in 2013 by Danish entrepreneurs Michael Stausholm, Kasper Tikjøb Andersen and Jonathan Løw.

The company's main product is the Sprout Pencil. These pencils sprout into vegetables, herbs and flowering plants which was originally invented by three students from Massachusetts Institute of Technology (MIT) in Boston.

SproutWorld is commercially successful in Denmark and a number of other European countries including Northern America. Today, the company sells the Sprout pencils in more than 80 different countries.

Currently, SproutWorld has offices in Denmark and the US.

References

External links 

Manufacturing companies of Denmark
2013 establishments in Denmark
Manufacturing companies established in 2013